The Hamilton Fish Newburgh–Beacon Bridge is a cantilever toll bridge that spans the Hudson River in New York State. The bridge carries Interstate 84 (I-84) and New York State Route 52 (NY 52) between Newburgh and Beacon and consists of two separate spans. The original northern span, which now carries westbound traffic, was opened on November 2, 1963, as a two-lane (one in each direction) bridge. A second span, completed in 1980, now carries all eastbound traffic. Still often referred to by its original name, the Newburgh–Beacon Bridge, in 1997 the bridge was rededicated in honor of Hamilton Fish III, a 12-term member of the U.S. House of Representatives, and his son and namesake Hamilton Fish IV, a 13-term member of the House.

History
Although original plans called for a four-lane bridge, funding difficulties resulted in the reduction in lanes. This span was designed by Modjeski & Masters and constructed by Frederick Snare, Drave, and Bethlehem Steel. 

The bridge originally carried NY 52 traffic, which was light, but the construction of Interstate 84 pushed the bridge over capacity, and planning for additional capacity began in 1972. After considering double-decking (which the original bridge was not designed for) the decision was taken by NYSBA to add a second parallel span south of the original.

The original span is made of steel that requires regular painting. The newer span is made of weathering steel (believed to be COR-TEN or similar, although sources are not clear), the surface of which intentionally corrodes, forming a brown colored protective layer that does not require paint.

On November 1, 1980, this second, parallel span, also designed by Modjeski & Masters but constructed by the American Bridge Company, was opened to traffic. The original span was closed for renovation, to add a lane and to paint it brown to match the color of the new span, from December 1980 to June 1984. In 1997, the bridge was officially renamed the Hamilton Fish Newburgh–Beacon Bridge, although it is commonly referred to by its original name.

Road dimensions
 The westbound (northern) bridge opened in 1963, carrying one lane of traffic in each direction. Today it accommodates three  travel lanes and has no permanent shoulders. Variable lane-use signs allow the right lane to be designated as a breakdown lane at night and off-peak travel times.  When the right lane is being used as a shoulder, a red X appears on the signs above it, while a green arrow illuminates when the lane is used for travel during peak times.
 The newer eastbound span was built with three  travel lanes, a  right shoulder, a  left shoulder and a pedestrian sidewalk separated from the roadway by a concrete barrier. Because the eastbound span was built with shoulders, there is no need to reduce the travel lanes to two during off-peak times.

Connections
The span provides connections to the New York State Thruway (I-87) and U.S. Route 9W (US 9W) in Newburgh and US 9 in Fishkill.

Usage
The bridges, owned by the New York State Bridge Authority, carry six lanes of traffic and approximately 65,000 vehicles per day.

Tolls
Eastbound passenger vehicles are currently (as of December 10th, 2022) charged a cash toll of $2.00 to cross the span, or $1.45 for E-ZPass. The toll plaza is located on the eastern (Beacon) shore. Originally, tolls were collected in both directions. In August 1970, the toll was abolished for westbound drivers, and at the same time, eastbound drivers saw their tolls doubled. The tolls of eleven other New York–New Jersey and Hudson River crossings along a  stretch, from the Outerbridge Crossing in the south to the Rip Van Winkle Bridge in the north, were also changed to eastbound-only at that time.

In 2019, the bridge authority announced that tolls on its five Hudson River crossings would increase each year beginning in 2020 and ending in 2023. As of May 1, 2021, the current toll for passenger cars traveling eastbound on the Mid-Hudson Bridge was $1.75 in cash, $1.45 for E-ZPass users. In May 2022, tolls will rise to $1.55 for E-ZPass users and $2 for cash payers. In 2023, the E-ZPass toll will increase to $1.65, and the cash toll will rise to $2.15. 

At midnight on July 7, 2021, the bridge was converted to all-electronic tolling on the eastbound span.

See also
 
 
 
 List of fixed crossings of the Hudson River

References

External links

 NYSBA - Newburgh-Beacon Bridge
 NYCroads.com - Newburgh-Beacon Bridge

Bridges over the Hudson River
Bridges in Orange County, New York
New York State Bridge Authority
Bridges completed in 1980
Bridges completed in 1963
Tolled sections of Interstate Highways
Interstate 84 (Pennsylvania–Massachusetts)
Beacon, New York
Newburgh, New York
Road bridges in New York (state)
Weathering steel
Bridges on the Interstate Highway System
Toll bridges in New York (state)
Steel bridges in the United States
Cantilever bridges in the United States
Buildings and structures in Newburgh, New York